Dying in the Sun is a BBC Books original novel written by Jon de Burgh Miller and based on the long-running British science fiction television series Doctor Who. It features the Second Doctor, Ben, and Polly.

Synopsis
Los Angeles, 1947. LAPD detective Robert Chate is convinced that the man who calls himself 'The Doctor' has something to do with the murder of multi-millionaire movie producer Harold Reitman.

The Doctor aids the police in their investigation, while looking into 'Star Light Pictures'. The Doctor is convinced there is a powerful threat hidden somewhere in the soon to be released film 'Dying In the Sun'. He decides to stop the release any way he can and faces opposition from the Hollywood power structure.

TARDIS
In the novel not only does the TARDIS not appear, but it is not even mentioned that the characters have travelled through time to the story's setting.

Fiction set in 1947
2001 British novels
2001 science fiction novels
Past Doctor Adventures
Second Doctor novels
British science fiction novels
Novels by Jon de Burgh Miller
BBC Books books
Fictional portrayals of the Los Angeles Police Department
Hollywood novels